Hard Love is the sixth studio album by American Christian rock band Needtobreathe, released on July 15, 2016, through Atlantic Records.

Hard Love garnered three singles including "Happiness", "Testify", and "Great Night".

Background and recording
Hard Love was produced by Dave Tozer, Ed Cash, Jon Levine, Ido Zmishlany and co-produced by the band. The album was recorded at Plantation Studios in Charleston, South Carolina, Night Fox Studio and Germano Studios in New York, NY.

Promotion
In support of the album, the band went on a "Tour De Compadres 2016" that began on August 17, 2016, and concluded on November 12, 2016. The tour included 53 stops across the United States.

Critical reception

Hard Love received mostly positive reviews from music critics. AllMusic's Neil Z. Yeung rated the album four out of five stars and calls it "cleverly crafted praise music." Chris Major of TheChristianBeat.org rated the album 4.4 out of 5 and writes, "(the album) packs both energy and encouragement into its forty minute runtime. With diverse sounds and deep thought poured into each song, NEEDTOBREATHE does not hold back has outdone itself once again. H A R D L O V E is easily worth a full listen-through from both fans and new audiences." Jesus Freak Hideout's Christopher Smith rated the album three and a half stars out of five and calls it "a solid record."

Awards and accolades 
On August 9, 2017, it was announced that H A R D L O V E would be nominated for a GMA Dove Award in the Rock/Contemporary Album of the Year category at the 48th Annual GMA Dove Awards.

On October 17, 2017, H A R D L O V E won the GMA Dove Award for Rock/Contemporary Album of the Year with Kari Jobe alongside art producers Jon Levine, Dave Tozer, Ed Cash and Ido Zmishalny being the receipts at a ceremony at Allen Arena in Nashville, Tennessee.

Commercial performance
Hard Love debuted at No. 1 on the Top Album Sales chart and at No. 2 on the US Billboard 200, moving 50,000 equivalent album units in its first week of release, of which 46,000 were in traditional album sales. This is the band's highest charting album to date, besting the No. 3 Billboard 200 debut of their 2014 release Rivers in the Wasteland.

Track listing

Personnel 
Credits for Hard Love adapted from album liner notes.

Needtobreathe
 Bear Rinehart – vocals, synthesizers, guitars, slide guitar, ukulele
 Bo Rinehart – synthesizers, programming, guitars, mandola, backing vocals
 Josh Lovelace – acoustic piano, organ, synthesizers, backing vocals
 Seth Bolt – synthesizers, bass guitar, drum programming, percussion, backing vocals

Additional musicians
 Jon Levine – additional keyboards (2), drum programming (2)
 Dave Tozer – acoustic piano (3), organ (3, 4, 7), programming (3, 7), guitars (3, 4, 10), bass guitar (3), handclaps (3, 4), synthesizers (4, 10), drum programming (4, 10), tambourine (4), finger snaps (4), stomps (4), backing vocals (7), synth bass (10)
 Chris Connors – programming (3), synthesizers (4, 10), drum programming (4, 10), organ (10)
 Rodrick Simmons – organ (5), keyboards (6)
 Ido Zmishlany – keyboards (6), programming (6), guitars (6), backing vocals (6)
 Roger Cliche – organ (6)
 Sam Getz – guitars (7), additional guitars (9)
 John Murchison – upright bass (4)
 Pete Donnelly – bass (7)
 Dylan Wissing – drums (3, 7)
 Will Chapman – drums (8), programming (8)
 Colin Callahan – handclaps (3)
 Matt Schenck – handclaps (3)
 Tomás Shannon – handclaps (3)
 Randall Harris – handclaps (4), finger snaps (4), stomps (4)
 Hayden Lamb – handclaps (7), backing vocals (7)
 Simon Harding – saxophone (2, 3)
 Steve Tirpak – trombone (3), trumpet (3)
 Chuck Dalton – trumpet (2, 3)
 Clayton Bryant – backing vocals (3, 4, 10)
 Carla Kelly – backing vocals (3, 10)
 Carmen Roman – backing vocals (3, 10)
 Darnell White – backing vocals (3, 4)
 Michael Trent – vocals (7)
 Cary Ann Hearst – vocals (7)
 Randall Harris – backing vocals (7), drums (9)
 Ebony Johnson – backing vocals (10)

Technical
 Seth Bolt – engineer (1-5, 7-12), additional engineer (6)
 Bo Rinehart – engineer (2, 11, 12)
 Chris Connors – engineer (3, 4, 7, 10)
 Dave Tozer – engineer (3, 4, 7, 10)
 Ido Zmishlany – engineer (6)
 Ed Cash – engineer (11, 12)
 Randall Harris – assistant engineer (1-5, 7, 8, 10)
 Matt Schenck – assistant engineer (3, 7, 10)
 Mikey Reaves – assistant engineer (4, 5, 10)
 Michael Trent – additional engineer (7)
 Robert Orton – mixing
 Dave Kutch – mastering at The Mastering Place (New York, NY)

Design and Additional Credits
 Pete Ganbarg – A&R
 Mikey Reaves – additional vocal production (2)
 Eric Hurtgen – creative direction, cover design
 Bo Rinehart – creative direction, cover design 
 Joshua Drake – cover photography
 Eric Ryan Anderson – additional photography 
 Steve Bursky – management

Charts

Weekly charts

Year-end charts

Release history

References

Needtobreathe albums
2016 albums
Atlantic Records albums